Blackfeet Community College is a private tribal land-grant community college on the Blackfeet reservation in Browning, Montana.
The Blackfeet reservation occupies an area of 1,525,712 acres adjacent to Glacier National Park, Lewis and Clark National Forest, and the province of Alberta, Canada. In 1994, the college was designated a land-grant college alongside 31 other tribal colleges.

Campus
The BCC campus is located on the south end of Browning, the trade/service center for the reservation, just off Highways 2 & 89. The campus consists of thirteen buildings used for administration, student services, academic affairs, vocational education departments, classrooms, various programs, and the library.

Partnership
BCC is a member of the American Indian Higher Education Consortium (AIHEC), a community of tribally and federally chartered institutions working to strengthen tribal nations and make a lasting difference in the lives of American Indians and Alaska Natives. BCC was created in response to the higher education needs of American Indians. BCC generally serves geographically isolated populations that have no other means of accessing education beyond the high school level.

References

External links
 Blackfeet Community College
 Bureau of Indian Education National Directory

Educational institutions established in 1974
Two-year colleges in the United States
Universities and colleges accredited by the Northwest Commission on Colleges and Universities
Tribal Colleges in Montana
Education in Glacier County, Montana
Buildings and structures in Glacier County, Montana
1974 establishments in Montana
American Indian Higher Education Consortium